Natalya Viktorovna Nazarova (born May 26, 1979, Moscow) is a track and field sprinter.

She was born in Moscow. Following a personal best time of 49.65 seconds run a fortnight earlier, Natalya had lost form by the start of the 2004 Summer Olympics in Athens, Greece, and only just made the final finishing 8th. She did get a silver in the relay.

She finished fourth at the 2003 World Championships.

On January 8, 2004 Natalya Nazarova broke the sixteen-year-old indoor world record for the rarely run 500 metres in a time of 1:07.36, that had been set by Olga Nazarova (no relation).

Major achievements
1998
World Junior Championships - Annecy, France.
400 m gold medal
4 × 400 m relay silver medal
1999
World Championships - Seville, Spain.
4 × 400 m relay gold medal
World Indoor Championships - Maebashi, Japan.
4 × 400 m relay gold medal
2000
European Indoor Championships - Ghent, Belgium.
400 m silver medal
2002
Russian Championships - Cheboksary.
400 m silver medal
2003
World Championships - Paris, France.
4 × 400 m relay silver medal
World Indoor Championships - Birmingham, England.
400 m gold medal
4 × 400 m relay gold medal
Russian Championships - Tula.
400 m gold medal
Russian Indoor Championships
400 m gold medal
2004
World Indoor Championships - Budapest, Hungary.
400 m gold medal
4 × 400 m relay gold medal in world record 3:23.88
Russian Championships - Tula.
400 m gold medal
Russian Indoor Championships
400 m gold medal in national record 49.68 s.
2006
World Indoor Championships - Moscow, Russia.
4 × 400 m relay gold medal

References

External links

1979 births
Living people
Athletes from Moscow
Russian female sprinters
Olympic female sprinters
Olympic athletes of Russia
Olympic silver medalists for Russia
Olympic bronze medalists for Russia
Olympic silver medalists in athletics (track and field)
Olympic bronze medalists in athletics (track and field)
Athletes (track and field) at the 2000 Summer Olympics
Athletes (track and field) at the 2004 Summer Olympics
Athletes (track and field) at the 2012 Summer Olympics
Medalists at the 2012 Summer Olympics
Medalists at the 2004 Summer Olympics
Medalists at the 2000 Summer Olympics
Competitors stripped of Summer Olympics medals
Universiade gold medalists in athletics (track and field)
Universiade gold medalists for Russia
Medalists at the 2005 Summer Universiade
World Athletics Championships athletes for Russia
World Athletics Championships winners
World Athletics Championships medalists
World Athletics Indoor Championships winners
World Athletics Indoor Championships medalists
European Athletics Championships medalists
Russian Athletics Championships winners